Orhan Ghazi (also spelled Orkhan,  1281 – March 1362) was the second bey of the Ottoman Beylik from 1323/4 to 1362. He was born in Söğüt, as the son of Osman I.

In the early stages of his reign, Orhan focused his energies on conquering most of northwestern Anatolia. The majority of these areas were under Byzantine rule and he won his first battle at Pelekanon against the Byzantine Emperor Andronikos III Palaiologos. Orhan also occupied the lands of the Karasids of Balıkesir and the Ahis of Ankara.

A series of civil wars surrounding the ascension of the nine-year-old Byzantine emperor John V Palaiologos greatly benefited Orhan. In the Byzantine civil war of 1341–1347, the regent John VI Kantakouzenos married his daughter Theodora to Orhan and employed Ottoman warriors against the rival forces of the empress dowager, allowing them to loot Thrace. In the Byzantine civil war of 1352–1357, Kantakouzenos used Ottoman forces against John V, granting them the use of a European fortress at Çimpe around 1352. A major earthquake devastated Gallipoli (modern Gelibolu) two years later, after which Orhan's son, Süleyman Pasha, occupied the town, giving the Ottomans a strong bridgehead into mainland Europe.

According to Muslim scholar Ibn Battuta, Orhan was "the greatest of the Turkmen kings and the richest in wealth, lands, and military forces".

Passage of power
Osman Gazi died in either 1323 or 1324, and Orhan succeeded him. According to Ottoman tradition, when Orhan succeeded his father, he proposed to his brother, Alaeddin, that they should share the emerging empire. The latter refused on the grounds that their father had designated Orhan as sole successor, and that the empire should not be divided. He only accepted as his share the revenues of a single village near Bursa.

Orhan then told him, "Since, my brother, thou will not take the flocks and the herds that I offer thee, be thou the shepherd of my people; be my Vizier." The word vizier, vezir in the Ottoman language, from Arabic wazīr, meant the bearer of a burden. Alaeddin, in accepting the office, accepted his brother's burden of power, according to oriental historians. Alaeddin, like many of his successors in that office, did not often command the armies in person, but he occupied himself with the foundation and management of the civil and military institutions of the state.

Government
According to some authorities, it was in Alaeddin's time, and by his advice, that the Ottomans ceased acting like vassals to the Seljuk ruler: they no longer stamped money with his image or used his name in public prayers. These changes are attributed by others to Osman himself, but the vast majority of the oriental writers concur in attributing to Alaeddin the introduction of laws respecting the costume of the various subjects of the empire, and the creation and funding of a standing army of regular troops. It was by his advice and that of a contemporary Turkish statesman that the celebrated corps of Janissaries was formed, an institution which European writers erroneously  fix at a later date, and ascribe to Murad I.

Janissaries

Alaeddin, by his military legislation, may be truly said to have organized victory for the Ottoman dynasty. He organised for the Ottoman Beylik a standing army of regularly paid and disciplined infantry and horses, a full century before Charles VII of France established his fifteen permanent companies of men-at-arms, which are generally regarded as the first modern standing army.

Orhan's predecessors, Ertuğrul and Osman I, had made war at the head of the armed vassals and volunteers. This army rode on horseback to their prince's banner when summoned for each expedition, and were disbanded as soon as the campaign was over. Alaeddin determined to ensure any future success by forming a corps of paid infantry, which was to be kept in constant readiness for service. These troops were called Yaya, or piyade. They were divided into tens, hundreds, and thousands with their commanders. Their pay was high, and their pride soon caused their sovereign some anxiety. Orhan wished to provide a check to them, and he took counsel for this purpose with his brother Alaeddin and Kara Khalil Çandarlı (of House of Candar), who was connected with the royal house by marriage. Çandarlı laid before his master and the vizier a project. Out of this arose the renowned corps of Janissaries, which was considered the scourge of the Balkans and Central Europe for a long time, until it was abolished by Sultan Mahmud II in 1826.

Çandarlı proposed to Orhan to create the Janissary corps, an army entirely composed of the children of conquered places. Çandarlı argued that:

He also claimed that incorporating children of the conquered would induce other people to enlist: their friends and relations, who would come as volunteers to join the Ottoman ranks. Acting on this advice, Orhan selected a thousand of the finest boys from conquered Christian families. The recruits were trained according to their individual abilities, and employed in posts ranging from professional soldier to Grand Vizier. This practice continued for centuries, until the reign of Sultan Mehmed IV.

Politics

Initial expansion

Orhan invaded Byzantine territories in northwest Anatolia. First, in 1321, Orhan captured Mudanya, the port linking the city of Bursa to the Sea of Marmara coast. He then sent a column under Konur Alp towards the west Black Sea coast; another column under Aqueda to capture Kocaeli, and finally a column to capture the southeast coast of the Sea of Marmara. Then, he captured Bursa by persuading its Byzantine commander to defect. As Evrenos Bey, he became a commander of light cavalry, and he and his sons and grandsons led Ottoman troops in the Balkans. Once Bursa was captured, Orhan sent cavalry towards the Bosphorus, capturing Byzantine towns on the Marmara coast. There were even sightings of Ottoman light cavalry along the Bosphorus coast, and Ottoman forces laid siege to Nicaea (second only to Constantinople in the Byzantine Empire).

In 1329, Byzantine Emperor Andronikos III led a mercenary army to relieve Nicaea and regain Kocaeli. In the ensuing battle of Pelekanon (now Darica, near Scutari, now Üsküdar), on 10 or 15 June, Orhan's disciplined troops routed the Byzantines. Thereafter Andronikos abandoned the idea of getting Kocaeli back and never again conducted a field battle against Ottoman forces.

Nicaea surrendered to Orhan after a three-year siege that concluded in 1331. Orhan captured Nicomedia in 1337. Orhan gave the command of Nicomedia to his eldest son, Suleyman Pasha, who had directed the operations of the siege.

In 133, Orhan captured Scutari; most of northwest Anatolia was in Ottoman hands. The Byzantines still controlled the coastal strip from Şile on the Black Sea to Scutari and the city of Amastris (now Amasra) in Paphlagonia, but these were so scattered and isolated as to be no threat to the Ottomans.

In 1345, there was a change of strategy. Instead of aiming to gain land from non-Muslims, Orhan took over a Turkish principality, Karesi (present Balıkesir and surroundings). According to Islamic philosophy of war, the areas under Islamic rule were to be abodes of peace and the other areas abodes of war. Conducting a war in abodes of war was considered a good deed. Karesi principality was a state governed by a Turkish emir and its main inhabitants were Turkish so it was an abode of peace. The Ottomans had to have special justification for conquering fellow Muslim Turkish principalities.

In the case of Karesi, the ruler had died and had left two sons whose claims to the post of emir were equally valid. So there was a fight between the armed supporters of the two claimant princes. Orhan's pretext for invasion was that he was acting as a bringer of peace. In the end of the invasion by Ottoman troops the two brothers were pushed to the castle of their capital city of Pergamum (now Bergama). One was killed and the other was captured. The territories around Pergamum and Palaeocastro (Balıkesir) were annexed to Orhan's domains. This conquest was particularly important since it brought Orhan's territories to Çanakkale, the Anatolian side of the Dardanelles Straits.

With the conquest of Karesi, nearly the whole of northwestern Anatolia was included in the Ottoman Beylik, and the four cities of Bursa, Nicomedia, Nicaea, and Pergamum had become strongholds of its power. At this stage of his conquests, Orhan's Ottoman Principality had four provinces:
Original land grant area of Söğüt and Eskişehir;
Hüdavendigar (Domain of the Sultan) area of Bursa and İznik;
Koca Eli peninsular area around İzmit;
former principality of Karesi around Balıkesir and Bergama.

Consolidation period

A twenty-year period of peace followed the acquisition of Karesi. During this time, the Ottoman sovereign was actively occupied in perfecting the civil and military institutions which his brother had introduced, in securing internal order, in founding and endowing mosques and schools, and in the construction of vast public edifices, many of which still stand. Orhan did not continue with any other conquests in Anatolia except taking over Ankara from the commercial-religious fraternity guild of Ahis.

The general diffusion of Turkish populations over Anatolia, before Osman's time, was in main part a push from the Mongol conquest of Central Asia, Iran and then East Anatolia. Turkish peoples had founded a number of principalities after the demise of the Anatolian Sultanate of Rum, after its defeat by the Ilkhanate Mongols. Although they were all of Turkish stock, they were all rivals for dominant status in Anatolia.

After the Byzantine defeat of the Battle of Pelekanon, Orhan developed friendly relations with Andronicus III Palaeologus, and maintained them with some of his successors. Therefore, the Ottoman power experienced a twenty-year period of general repose.

However, as the Byzantine civil war of 1341–1347 dissipated the last resources of the Byzantine Empire, the auxiliary armies of the Emirs of Turkish principalities were frequently called over and employed in Europe. In 1346, Emperor John VI Cantacuzene recognised Orhan as the most powerful sovereign of the Turks. He aspired to attach the Ottoman forces permanently to his interests, and hoped to achieve this by giving his second daughter, Theodora, in marriage to their ruler, despite differences of creed and the disparity of age. However, in Byzantine and in Western European history, dynastic marriages were quite usual and there are many examples which were much more strange.

The splendour of the wedding between Orhan and Theodora at Selymbria (Silivri) is elaborately described by Byzantine writers. In the following year, Orhan and Theodora visited his imperial father-in-law at Üsküdar, (then Chrysopolis) the suburb of Constantinople on the Asiatic side of the Bosporus where there was a display of festive splendor. However, this close relationship soured when Byzantines suffered from marauding migrant Turcoman bands that had crossed the Marmara Sea and Dardanelles and pillaged several towns in Thrace. After a series of such raids, the Byzantines had to use superior forces to deal with them.

Ibn Battuta gave the following account of Orhan during his reign:

Decline of Byzantine Empire

During Orhan's reign as the Ottoman emir, the Byzantine Empire declined – partly due to the ambitions of Italian maritime states and to the aggression of the Turcomans and other city Turks, but also due to civil wars within the empire.

During these years the Byzantine Empire became so weak that commercial supremacy in the surrounding seas around it became a bone of contention for the Italian maritime commercial city states. The Republic of Genoa possessed Galata, a separate Genoese city across the Golden Horn from Constantinople itself. The Genoese had fought the Byzantines earlier in 1348 when the Byzantines had decreased their customs tariffs in order to attract trade to the Byzantine side of the Golden Horn. In 1352 the rivalry for trade led to a war between Genoa and Venice. The Genoese, in resisting a Venetian fleet attacking their ships in the Golden Horn, bombarded the sea walls of Constantinople and pushed the Byzantines to ally with the Venetians. The Venetians assembled a large naval force, including hired fleets from Peter IV of Aragon and from the Byzantine Empire of John VI Cantacuzene. The sea battle between the Venetian fleet under the command of Niccolo Pisani and the Genoese fleet under Paganino Doria led to defeat of Venetians and their Byzantine allies. Orhan opposed the Venetians, whose fleets and piratical raids were disrupting his seaward provinces, and who had met his diplomatic overtures with contempt. The Venetians were allies of John VI, so Orhan sent an auxiliary force across the straits to Galata, which there co-operated with the Genoese.

In the midst of the distress and confusion that the Byzantine Empire now suffered, Orhan's eldest son, Suleyman Pasha, captured the Castle of Tzympe (Cinbi) in a bold move which gave the Turks a permanent foothold on the European side of the Dardanelles Straits. He also started to settle migrant Turcomans and town-dwelling Turks in the strategic city and castle of Gelibolu (Gallipoli), which had been devastated by a severe earthquake and was therefore evacuated by its inhabitants. Suleyman refused various financial inducements offered by John VI to empty the castle and the city. The emperor pleaded with his son-in-law Orhan to meet personally and discuss the matter, but the request was either rejected or could not be carried out due to Orhan's age and ill-health.

This military situation remained unresolved, in part because of the eruption of hostilities between John VI and his co-emperor and son-in-law John V Palaeologus. John V was dismissed from his imperial post and exiled to Tenedos; Cantacuzene's son Matthew was crowned as the co-emperor. But very soon John V returned from exile with Venetian help and conducted a coup, taking over the government of Constantinople. Although the two men came to an agreement to share power, John VI resigned from his imperial post and became a monk. Each of these two contestants for power was continually soliciting Orhan's aid against the other, and Orhan supported whichever side would benefit the Ottomans.

Last years

Orhan was the longest living and one of the longest reigning of the future Ottoman Sultans. In his last years he had left most of the powers of state in the hands of his second son Murad and lived a secluded life in Bursa.

In 1356 Orhan and Theodora's son, Khalil, was abducted somewhere on the Bay of Izmit. A Genoese commercial boat captain, which was conducting acts of piracy alongside commercial activity, was able to capture the young prince and take him over to Phocaea on the Aegean Sea, which was under Genoese rule. Orhan was very much upset by this kidnapping and conducted talks with his brother-in-law and now sole Byzantine Emperor John V Palaeologos. As to the agreement, John V with a Byzantine naval fleet went to Phocaea, paid the ransom demanded of 100,000 hyperpyra, and brought Khalil back to Ottoman territory.

In 1357 Orhan's eldest and most experienced son and likely heir, Suleyman Pasha, died after injuries sustained from a fall from a horse near Bolayir on the coast of the sea of Marmara. The horse that Suleyman fell from was buried alongside him and their tombs can still be seen today. Orhan was said to have been greatly affected by the death of his son.

Orhan died soon after, likely from natural causes. It seems rather likely that the death of his son was taxing on his health, however. Orhan died in 1362, in Bursa, at the age of eighty, after a reign of thirty-six years. He is buried in the türbe (tomb) with his wife and children, called Gümüşlü Kumbet in Bursa.

Family

Consorts 
Orhan had at least seven consorts: 
 Asporça Hatun. Noblewoman of Greek or Byzantine origins, mother of two sons and two daughters. Orhan granted her ownership of several villages.
 Nilüfer Hatun. Slave concubine of Greek descent, mother of Murad I and other two sons.
 Melek Hatun. Mother of Sultan Hatun. 
 Efendi Hatun. Also called Efendize Hatun, she is listed both as the daughter of Osman I's brother Gündüz Bey (so Orhan's cousin); that of Mahmud Alp.
 Theodora Kantakouzene. Daughter of John VI Kantakouzenos. Remaining a Christian even after her marriage, she undertook to try to convince Muslim converts to return to Christianity. Mother of Halil Bey. 
 Bayalun Hatun. Byzantine princess of the Palaeologus family. 
 Theodora Uroš. Daughter of Stefan Uroš IV Dušan, Serbian ruler. At the time of the wedding, Orhan was seventy, while she was only twelve. The marriage was supposed to stop hostilities between Serbia and Ottoman Empire, however, the Serbian diplomats were attacked by Nikephoros Orsini, and after which Serbia and the Ottoman state resumed hostilities.

Son 
Orhan had at least six sons: 
 Süleyman Pasha (1316-1357) - with Nilüfer Hatun. Eldest son, he was at the head of the expansion campaigns in Thrace. He died from a fall from a horse. 
 Ibrahim Bey (1316-1362) - with Asporça Hatun. Governor of Eskişehir, was executed by order of his half-brother Murad I. 
 Murad I (1326-1389) - with Nilüfer Hatun. Sultan of the Ottoman Empire after his father. 
 Kasım Bey (?-1346) - with Nilüfer Hatun. 
 Şerefullah Bey - with Asporça Hatun.  
 Halil Bey (1347-1362) - with Teodora Kantakouzene. As a child, he was kidnapped by Genoese pirates and ransomed with the help of John V Palaeologus. Subsequently, Halil married John's daughter, Irene.

Daughters 
Orhan had at least four daughters: 
Hatice Hatun. She married her cousin Süleyman Bey, son of Savci Bey and nephew of Osman I. 
 Selçuk Hatun - with Asporça Hatun. 
 Fatma Hatun - with Asporça Hatun. 
 Sultan Hatun - with Melek Hatun.

In popular culture 
In the Turkish television series  (1988), Orhan Gazi has been portrayed.

In the Turkish movie Killing the Shadows, Orhan Gazi is portrayed by Ragıp Savaş.

References
 Incorporates text from "History of Ottoman Turks" (1878)

External links

 The project "involves extracting and analysing detailed information from primary sources, including contemporary chronicles, cartularies, necrologies and testaments."
A listing of descendants of Ertuğrul, alongside other royalty

1281 births
1362 deaths
14th-century Ottoman sultans
Burials in Turkey
Ottoman people of the Byzantine–Ottoman wars
Infectious disease deaths in the Ottoman Empire